Beachlands is the name of several places:

In Australia
Beachlands, Western Australia

In New Zealand
Beachlands, New Zealand, a suburb of Auckland
Beachlands Speedway, a motor racing circuit near Dunedin, New Zealand

In the United Kingdom
Beachlands, Hampshire, on Hayling Island